The Charazani tree frog (Hyloscirtus charazani)  is a species of frog in the family Hylidae found in Bolivia and possibly Peru. It has been observed between 2700 and 3200 meters above sea level.

Its natural habitats are subtropical or tropical dry forests and rivers. It is currently threatened by water pollution.

References

Hyloscirtus
Amphibians of Bolivia
Amphibians of the Andes
Amphibians described in 1970
Taxonomy articles created by Polbot